The year 1838 in architecture involved some significant architectural events and new buildings.

Buildings and structures

Buildings opened
 April 8 – The British National Gallery first opens to the public in the building purpose-designed for it by William Wilkins in Trafalgar Square, London.

Buildings completed
 Palazzo Gavazzi, Milan, Italy, designed by Luigi Clerichetti.
 Rideau Hall, Ottawa, Canada, built by Scottish architect Thomas McKay.
 Walton Hall, Cheshire, England, designed for Sir Gilbert Greenall, 1st Baronet, possibly by Edmund Sharpe.
 Chota Imambara, Lucknow.

Awards
 Grand Prix de Rome, architecture: Toussaint Uchard.

Births

 January 23 – John James Clark, Australian architect (died 1915)
 April 13 – J. D. Sedding, English ecclesiastical architect (died 1891)
 May 16 – Thomas Forrester, New Zealand plasterer, draughtsman, architect and engineer (died 1907)
 September 18 – Thomas Drew, Irish ecclesiastical architect (died 1910)
 September 29 – Henry Hobson Richardson, American city architect (died 1886)

Deaths
 September 5 – Charles Percier, French Neoclassical architect, interior decorator and designer (born 1764)
 October 16 – William Vitruvius Morrison, Irish architect, son and collaborator of Sir Richard Morrison (born 1794)

References

Architecture
Years in architecture
19th-century architecture